Islamabad United is a Pakistani professional Twenty20 franchise cricket team that competes in the Pakistan Super League (PSL). The team is based in Islamabad, the capital city of Pakistan, and was formed in 2015 to compete in the first season of the competition.

The franchise is owned by Leonine Global Investments through its sports entity Leonine Global Sports, owned by Amna Naqvi and Ali Naqvi. Rehan Ul Haq is the General Manager of the franchise, Hassan Cheema is the Strategy Manager, while Azlan Khan heads the Operations and Logistics. The franchise won the first PSL title, defeating Quetta Gladiators in the inaugural final. They won their second title in the third season of the PSL, by defeating Peshawar Zalmi by three wickets in the final, and is currently the most successful franchise in the competition's history with the two title wins .

The team's home-ground is the Rawalpindi Cricket Stadium. The team is coached by Azhar Mahmood, who replaced Johan Botha who coached the side in 2021. Shadab Khan was named as the captain of the team before PSL 5, with that he became the youngest captain in PSL history. The team's bowling coach is Pakistani spinner Saeed Ajmal.

The leading run-scorer of the team is Luke Ronchi, while Shadab Khan is the leading wicket-taker.

Ownership 
The franchise is owned by Leonine Global Investments, which is focused on investments and business interest globally, through its sports entity Leonine Global Sports. The sports company also owns Hong Kong Island United, a franchise team in the Hong Kong T20 Blitz. Leonine Global is owned by Ali Naqvi and Amna Naqvi.

Franchise history 
In 2015, the Pakistan Cricket Board (PCB) announced that the inaugural season of the Pakistan Super League would take place in February 2016 in the United Arab Emirates. On 3 December 2015, the PCB unveiled the owners of five city-based franchises. The Islamabad franchise was sold to Leonine Global Sports for US$15 Million.

2016 season: champions

After a poor start to the 2016 Pakistan Super League, Islamabad United finished third in the round robin group stage, qualifying for the knock out stage of the tournament. The team won four matches out of eight, finishing with eight points from their group games.

They faced fourth-placed Karachi Kings in the eliminator, winning by nine wickets thanks to Mohammad Sami's man of the match performance of five wickets for eight runs from four overs. Brad Haddin and Dwayne Smith each scored fifties as United achieved their target of 111 in the 15th over.

In the second qualifier match Islamabad met Peshawar Zalmi. Sharjeel Khan scored 117 from 62 balls, the first century scored in the Pakistan Super League. It proved to be the difference between the teams as United posted 176 for three and Zalmi were bowled out for 126 with two full overs to go. United, spinner Imran Khalid took four wickets for 20 runs and Andre Russell three for 37. The win took United through to the final against Quetta Gladiators.

The 2016 Pakistan Super League Final was won by Islamabad by six wickets. United opted to bowl first after winning the toss and the Gladiators scored 174–7 in their 20 overs. Andre Russell, who finished the tournament as the leading wicket-taker, took three for 37. In reply United started well with Dwayne Smith scoring 73 runs and Brad Haddin an unbeaten 61, allowing United to score 174 for four with eight balls remaining and win the title.

2017 season

In the 2017 Pakistan Super League players draft, United retained 17 players from their previous squad. The team picked Ben Duckett, Zohaib Khan and Shadab Khan to complete their 20 men squad. Later Steven Finn replaced Andre Russell after he was banned for a year for doping breach.
Ben Duckett was replaced by Nicholas Pooran after Duckett left the squad ahead of play-offs due to national duties.

Islamabad United played the inaugural game of the 2017 season against Peshawar Zalmi, which they managed to win by seven wickets and thus continuing their winning streak from last season. In the following game, however, they lost to Lahore Qalandars by six wickets after posting 158 on the board. Misbah top-scored for United through his unbeaten innings of 61 off 36 balls that included five sixes.

As the tournament shifted to Sharjah, United continued to rebuild their campaign by handing Quetta Gladiators their first loss of the season. Chasing 149, they managed to do so at a loss of five wickets with 5-balls to spare. Sam Billings was the top-scorer with his aggressive knock of 78 from 50 balls. But in the following game against table-bottoms, Karachi Kings, United lost by 8-runs through the Duckworth-Lewis method. This came about after they posted 90 runs in their allotted 13 overs in a rain-marred game that was abandoned after 9.4 overs in the second innings. However, continuing on, United won a thrilling last-ball win against Peshawar Zalmi. Dwayne Smith was instrumental in his team's chase of 137 runs as he scored 72 off 59 balls after United's bowlers had earlier restricted the opposition to a below-par score. Following this victory, however, the team lost to Lahore Qalandars by one wicket in a tense game. Batting first, United had difficulties in building their innings and were at one time 83–6. But the team's emerging player, Shadab Khan, scored 42 off 24 balls to get United to a respectable total of 145 which almost proved match-winning.

With the tournament moving back to Dubai, United registered a thrilling win against Quetta Gladiators. After putting up a total of 166, the team was staring at almost certain defeat after the Gladiators were 148 for the loss of just one wicket at the 16th over. However, after a flurry of wickets and the inability of the opposition batsmen to finish the game, United prevailed by one run. This win also ensured the team of a play-off spot.

Just like last year, Islamabad again faced Karachi in the eliminator. In what proved to be a thrilling game, Karachi, batting first, scored a measly 126 getting all out in the process. Islamabad was set to win and qualify for the second play off. However, that was not the case as the second innings proved. The Karachi bowlers outshone the Islamabad batsmen with Mohammad Amir, Imad Wasim and Usama Mir each picking up three wickets. Islamabad were all out for a mere 82 runs, their lowest in the tournament and the then second-lowest in the tournament's history. Hence, the defending champions were knocked out.

2018 season : champions 

United started their 2018 season with a loss to Peshawar Zalmi. Chasing a target of 176, the team was reduced to 25-4 inside the powerplay before falling short by 34 runs in their allotted overs. The team rebounded in the next game, against Multan Sultans, by winning it with five wickets spare. Hussain Talat's unbeaten innings of 48 runs was instrumental in United's chase of 114 in difficult batting conditions.

As the league stage shifted to Sharjah, the team lost to Quetta Gladiators by six wickets as they failed to defend the 135-run target. United's key player and vice-captain, Rumman Raees, suffered a knee injuring during the match that has put his availability for the rest of the season in jeopardy. However, the next game, the team bounced back and won a thriller against Lahore Qalandars. The match went down to the Super Over as United managed to restrict the Qalandars to a level score of 121 during the initial innings. The Super Over target of 16 runs, in turn, was surmounted by a last ball six from Andre Russell. In the next game, the team ended the unbeaten run of Karachi Kings by beating them by 8 wickets in the chase of 154 runs. Luke Ronchi's aggressive innings of 71 (37) was the cornerstone of the victory. This meant that the team had qualified for the final.

In the final, Islamabad United won the match against Peshawer Zalmi after they chased a target of 149. Peshawar Zalmi won the toss and elected to bat first. Peshawar's in-form batsman Kamran Akmal was out lbw for one run off eight balls, with Samit Patel taking the wicket in the third over early on. Shadab Khan's three wickets restricted Peshawar to 148 runs. Islamabad's Luke Ronchi hit five sixes in the first five overs as he raced to 45 runs off just 15 balls, before he got out in the ninth over after scoring a 26-ball 52 in the second innings. By the time, Ronchi and Sahibzada Farhan - who played his own part with 44 runs off 33 balls - had put on 96 runs for the opening partnership in under nine overs. But a sudden collapse resulted in Islamabad losing six wickets for 20 runs leaving them at 116/6. The winning runs were scored by Faheem Ashraf who hooked Wahab Riaz for six with just one run required.

2019 season

In the opening match of the season, United defeated Lahore Qalandars after chasing down 171 in the 20th over, winning the match by five wickets. They then went on to lose their next two games against Multan Sultans by five wickets and Quetta Gladiators by seven wickets, respectively. In the next game against Peshawar Zalmi, Being sent to bat first, the defending champions were 49–3 at one stage before Ian Bell and Cameron Delport put on 56 runs which helped the side post a competitive total of 158 for nine in 20 overs. In the chase of 158, Zalmi were reeling at 65 for five at one stage. Kieron Pollard and Darren Sammy steadied the side with their 55-run partnership. Zalmi hopes of winnings were dashed after Pollard departed after scoring 51 runs. In the end, Islamabad managed to win by 12 runs after captain Mohammad Sami's hat-trick in the last over.

Regular Captain Mohammad Sami was out injured and young Shadab Khan had to lead the side for the first time. However, this didn't stop united to built their winning run as they won against Karachi Kings pretty easily in the end, thanks to Luke Ronchi's 35 balls 67 runs that won him Man of the match award. In the next fixture against Multan they had a very bad day, batting first they were bowled out for 121 runs and losing the match by six wickets. However, they won their next match against Kings. Kings started well with the bat and at one stage were looking to set a total over 200, but United bowlers bowled really well during the death overs to restrict Kings on 168 runs, mainly due to Faheem Ashraf and Rumman Raees. They started off well with the bat but few quite overs during the middle part of the innings meant United were in trouble, but thanks to Asif Ali who hit Kings bowlers to all sides of the ground, scoring 70 runs from 38 balls to ensure that United chase down the target with four balls to spare.

2020 season

Ahead of the season, Pakistan men's national team head coach and chief selector Misbah-ul-Haq was named as head coach, replacing Dean Jones who coached the side from the first season till the fourth season. Shadab Khan was named as the captain of the team, with that he became the youngest captain in PSL history.

2021 season

2022 season

2023 season

Team identity
The team logo and name was revealed on 22 December 2015 in a ceremony held at the Polo Club in Islamabad. The logo features a lion. The team's primary colours are red, orange and a light shade of brown.

Fawad Khan was the team's star ambassador between 2016 and 2018, while Ali Zafar was the team's star ambassador only for 2016 season. The franchise has also focused on Empowerment and Momina Mustehsan joined the team as its Empowerment Champion in 2017 season. The team's anthem in the initial season was "Chakka Choka" sung by Ali Zafar.  In 2017, new anthems of the team were released; "Cricket Jorray Pakistan" was sung by Momina Mustehsan, and "Kitna Rola Daalay Ga" by Abdullah Qureshi.

Dostea was the main sponsor and shirt sponsor of the team in 2016 while Cinepax and GLO Merchandise were merchandise sponsors. WWF Pakistan are the team's official partners. Mocca are team's current official food partners  with Dunya News and FM 101 the news and entertainment partners of the team respectively while PTV Sports is team's brand and media partner. For the second season, United signed with JS Bank as the title sponsor and Q Mobile as team's main partner respectively.  Other partners are PTCL, Yayvo and Igloo.

Ahead of 2019 season, franchise changed the design of the kit, previous kit had an equal shade of red and gold. However, the new kit for PSL 2019 featured red as a prominent shade with golden reduced to a minimum.

Current squad

Management and coaching staff

Source: IU website

Result summary

Seasons

 Tie+W and Tie+L indicates matches tied and then won or Lost in a tiebreaker such as a bowlout or one-over-eliminator ("Super Over")
 The result percentage excludes no results and counts ties (irrespective of a tiebreaker) as half a win.
Source: ESPNcricinfo, Last updated: 25 February 2022

Head-to-head record

Source: ESPNcricinfo, Last updated: 25 February 2022

Statistics

Most runs 

Source: ESPNcricinfo, Last updated: 28 September 2022

Most wickets 

Source: ESPNcricinfo, Last updated: 28 September 2022

References

External links
 
 Islamabad United at instagram
 Islamabad United at facebook
 Islamabad United at twitter

 
2016 establishments in Pakistan
Sport in Islamabad
Cricket clubs established in 2016
Sports clubs in Pakistan
Cricket in Islamabad